This is a partial list of man-made disasters in South Korea since the Korean War. It includes events that have a Wikipedia entry and other events mentioned in a reputable source

References 

Korea, South